Salvia potaninii is a herbaceous perennial plant that is native to Sichuan province in China, growing in thickets at  elevation. The upper surface of the leaf is covered with fine hairs, with the underside having glandular hairs.

Notes

potaninii
Flora of China